This is the complete discography for the American glam metal band Ratt.

Studio albums

EPs

Compilation albums

Videos
Ratt: The Video (1985)
Detonator Videoaction 1991 (1991)
Videos from the Cellar: The Atlantic Years (2007)

Singles

Music videos

References

Heavy metal group discographies
Discographies of American artists
Discography